CFOS is an AM radio station broadcasting from Owen Sound, Ontario, Canada. The format is oldies, classic adult contemporary music, and news (plus an adult standards/nostalgic music show, "Remember When," several nights a week from 8-11 p.m.), and is branded as 560 CFOS. CFOS is owned and operated by Bayshore Broadcasting of Owen Sound.

History
The station originally began broadcasting on March 1, 1940 at 1370 kHz, and changed frequencies to 1400 kHz on March 29, 1941 and again to 1470 kHz in 1947. In 1958, CFOS again changed frequencies from 1470 to its current frequency at 560 kHz.

CFOS was a network affiliate of CBC Radio's Dominion Network until 1962 and then affiliated with the main CBC Radio network for several years until 1983 when CBCB-FM launched.

On June 21, 1978, CFOS opened a semi-satellite station CFPS-AM at Port Elgin and CFPS was given approval by the Canadian Radio-television and Telecommunications Commission (CRTC) in 2005 to convert to 97.9 MHz.

In 1994, CFOS applied to operate a new operate a rebroadcaster at Collingwood on the frequency 1610 kHz. That application was denied on March 8, 1995.

In 2007, CFOS applied to add an FM signal at 96.1 MHz to rebroadcast the AM signal; the CRTC denied this application in February 2008.

References

External links
 560 CFOS
 
 

FOS
FOS
Radio stations established in 1940
1940 establishments in Ontario
FOS